Epiphany: The Best of Chaka Khan, Vol. 1 is a compilation album of recordings by American R&B/funk singer Chaka Khan, first released on the Warner Bros. Records label in 1996. Although the compilation, which reached #22 on Billboards R&B chart and #84 on Pop, was given the "Vol. 1" tag, it remains without a sequel to date.

The compilation would be re-issued by Warner's sublabel Reprise Records in 1999 with alternative cover art under the title I'm Every Woman - The Best of Chaka Khan. The collection was again re-issued as Epiphany: The Best of Chaka Khan, Vol. 1 in 2005, then also on the Reprise label.

History
After an at the time 23-year-long career in the music business which spanned over seventeen studio albums (nine solo, eight with the band Rufus) and a combined total of some fifty entries on Billboard'''s R&B singles chart, Epiphany was the first best of retrospective to be released, then summarising her recorded output in ten tracks; eight solo hits such as "I'm Every Woman", "I Feel for You", "I Know You, I Live You" and "Through The Fire", combined with two recordings from the Rufus era, "Ain't Nobody" and "Tell Me Something Good".

The Epiphany compilation is however mainly notable for including six tracks from what was originally intended to be Khan's tenth solo album, Dare You To Love Me, recorded between the years 1993 and 1995. Titles from the postponed and eventually cancelled album featured on the Epiphany compilation include "Love Me Still" (co-written by Bruce Hornsby, first released on the soundtrack to the 1995 Spike Lee movie Clockers), Khan's reggae-tinged cover version of Fleetwood Mac's "Everywhere", the duet "Never Miss the Water" with Me'shell Ndegéocello, "Somethin' Deep", "Your Love Is All I Know" and "Every Little Thing". A seventh title, "It Ain't Easy Lovin' Me", was released as an exclusive bonus track on the Japanese edition of Epiphany: The Best of Chaka Khan: Vol. 1.

Another seven recordings from the Dare You To Love Me sessions have surfaced on movie soundtracks, compilations or other artists' albums; "Miles Blowin'" (a tribute to the late Miles Davis, included on the Sugar Hill soundtrack, 1994), "Free Yourself" (on the To Wong Foo, Thanks for Everything! Julie Newmar soundtrack, 1995), "Don't Take Back Your Love" (on Gerry DeVeaux's album Devoted Songs, 1996),  Khan's recording of the jazz standard "My Funny Valentine" (on the Waiting to Exhale soundtrack, 1996), "Pain" (co-written by Prince, on the soundtrack to TV sitcom Living Single, 1997), "You And I Are One" and "Power" (both on the 1998 Zebra Records compilation A Song A Day). Three further recordings from the Dare You To Love Me sessions, including the title track, officially remain unreleased.Chaka Khan

The Epiphany compilation was promoted by the single release "Never Miss The Water" which included house and drum & bass remixes by Frankie Knuckles, Stylus Production and Candy Station. The single, issued on the Reprise Records label, became a #1 hit on Billboards Dance Chart and also reached #36 on R&B. "Your Love Is All I Know", "Every Little Thing" and "Everywhere" were also released as singles in certain territories, such as the UK, Germany and Japan.

Until February 2008, the compilation was certified Gold by RIAA, selling 796,000 units according to Nielsen SoundScan.

Track listing
"Ain't Nobody"  (Written by David "Hawk" Wolinski)  4:41
 From Rufus & Chaka Khan's 1983 album Stompin' at the Savoy - Live"Papillon (a.k.a. Hot Butterfly)"  (Gregg Diamond) - 4:08
 From the 1980 album Naughty"Tell Me Something Good" (Live) (Stevie Wonder) - 3:35
 From Rufus & Chaka Khan's 1983 album Stompin' at the Savoy - Live. Original studio version appears on Rufus' 1974 album Rags to Rufus"I Feel for You" (Feat. Stevie Wonder & Melle Mel) (Prince) - 5:46
 From the 1984 album I Feel for You"I Know You, I Live You" (Khan, Arif Mardin) - 4:28
 From the 1981 album What Cha' Gonna Do for Me"I'm Every Woman" (Ashford & Simpson) - 4:08
 From the 1978 album Chaka"Love Me Still" (Khan, Bruce Hornsby) - 3:28
 1995 recording, first released on movie soundtrack Clockers"The End of a Love Affair" (Edward Redding) - 5:13
 From the 1988 album CK"Dedicated in loving memory to Ella Fitzgerald"
"And the Melody Still Lingers On (A Night in Tunisia)"  (Feat. Dizzy Gillespie)  (Dizzy Gillespie, Frank Paparelli, Khan, Mardin) - 5:00
 From the 1981 album What Cha' Gonna Do for Me"Through the Fire" (David Foster, Tom Keane, Cynthia Weil) - 4:47
 From the 1984 album I Feel for You"What Cha' Gonna Do for Me" (Hamish Stuart, Ned Doheny) - 3:53
 From the 1981 album What Cha' Gonna Do for Me"Everywhere" (Christine McVie) - 4:52
 Previously unreleased recording, 1995
"Never Miss the Water" (featuring Me'shell Ndegéocello) (Gerry DeVeaux, Charlie Mole) - 4:46
 Previously unreleased recording, 1995
"Somethin' Deep" (Khan, Kipper Jones, Keith Crouch) - 4:58
 Previously unreleased recording, 1995
"Your Love Is All I Know" (Jud Friedman, Allan Rich, Chris Walker) - 4:35
 Previously unreleased recording, 1993
"Every Little Thing" (DeVeaux, David Gamson, Khan, Dave Thomas) - 5:12
 Previously unreleased recording, 1993
"It Ain't Easy Lovin' Me" (Gamson, Olivier Leiber, Khan, Allen Cato) - 4:26
 Bonus track Japanese edition. Previously unreleased recording, 1995

Personnel & production 1993-1995 recordings

"Love Me Still" (1995)
 Bruce Hornsby - piano, musical arrangement
 David Gamson - record producer
 Chaka Khan - producer, executive producer

"Everywhere" (1995)
 David Gamson - keyboards, drum machine
 Raymond Chue - Fender Rhodes
 Vere Isaac - bass guitar
 Allen Cato - guitar
 Paul Jackson Jr. - guitar
 David Gamson - producer
 Andre Betts - producer
 Bob Power - sound mix at Enterprise Studios

"Never Miss The Water" (1995)
 David Gamson - keyboards, drum machine,  producer, recording engineer
 Me'shell Ndegéocello - additional vocals, bass guitar
 Federico Gonzales Peña - Fender Rhodes, piano
 Luis Conte - percussion
 Wah Wah Watson - guitar
 Allen Cato - guitar
 Olivier Leiber - guitar
 Benjamin Wright - string arrangement
 Charles Veal - concertmaster
 Bob Power - sound mix at Enterprise Studios
 Rail Rogut - recording engineer

"Somethin' Deep" (1995)
 Keith Crouch - all other instruments
 Derrick Edmondson - saxophone solo, horn arrangement 
 Stephen Baxter - trombone
 John Fumo - trumpet
 Roy Pennon - bass guitar soloist
 Bob Power - sound mix at Enterprise Studios
 Rail Rogut - recording engineer

"Your Love Is All I Know" (1993)
 Steve Skinner - keyboards, synthesizer, arranger 
 Chieli Minucci - guitar
 Arif Mardin - producer, arranger
 Howard McCrary - background vocals
 Micheal O'Reilly - mix at Right Track Recording, NY, recording engineer
 Carl Nappa - assistant engineer
 Jason Goldstein - assistant engineer
 Recorded at The New Hit Factory, NY
 Gloria Gabriel - production coordinator

"Every Little Thing" (1993)
  David Gamson - producer, keyboards, drum machine
  Norman Brown - guitar
  Me'shell Ndegeocello - bass guitar
 Federico Gonzalez Pena - piano, Fender Rhodes 
 Chris Botti - trumpet, flugelhorn
 Micheal O'Reilly - mix at Right Track Recording, NY, recording engineer
 Carl Nappa - assistant engineer
 Jason Goldstein - assistant engineer
 Recorded at The New Hit Factory, NY
 Gloria Gabriel - production coordinator

Non-album tracks and remixes
 "Never Miss The Water" (Franktified Club Mix) - 9:56
 "Never Miss The Water" (The Classic Single)
 "Never Miss The Water" (Frankie's Sunday Mix) - 11:07
 "Never Miss The Water" (Dubjay's Duhlite) - 10:13
 "Never Miss The Water" (The Holywater Drum & Bass Mix) - 8:03
 "Never Miss The Water" (TV Mix) - 4:06
 "Never Miss The Water" (Deeper Mix) - 9:00
 "Never Miss The Water" (Deeper Dub) - 7:44
 "Never Miss The Water" (Extended Album Version) - 6:12
 "Never Miss The Water" (Lewis & Rich Mix) - 6:33
 "Never Miss The Water" (Stylus' Remix, Radio Edit) - 3:56
 "Never Miss The Water" (Stylus' Club Anthem) - 6:45
 "Never Miss The Water" (Stylus' Anthem Dub) - 6:52
 "Never Miss The Water" (Stylus' Street Mix) - 5:48
 "Never Miss The Water" (Stylus' Straight Pass Through) - 5:34
 "Never Miss The Water" (Stylus' Remix Instrumental) - 6:18
 "Never Miss The Water (A Cappella) - 4:28
 "Miles Blowin'" (Tina Harris, Ashley Hall) - 3:56
 "Miles Blowin'" (Disco 9000 Mix) - 6:02
 "Miles Blowin'" (Afro Cube Mix) - 5:32
 "Miles Blowin'" (Vinyl Republic Dub) - 5:58
 "Free Yourself" (Sami McKinney, Denise Rich, Warren McRae) - 4:13
 "Don't Take Back Your Love" (Gerry Deveaux) - 5:40
 "My Funny Valentine" (Richard Rodgers, Lorenz Hart) - 4:06
 "Pain" (Prince/N. Channison Berry) - 5:24
 "You And I Are One" (Howard McCreary, Chaka Khan) - 5:19
 "Power" (Howard McCreary, Chaka Khan) - 3:57

References

External linksEpiphany: The Best of Chaka Khan, Vol. 1'' at Discogs

1996 greatest hits albums
Chaka Khan compilation albums
Reprise Records compilation albums
Warner Records compilation albums